Nils Jonathan Johnsson (born January 11, 1993), better known as Jonathan Johnson, is a Swedish professional ice hockey centre, currently playing for Skellefteå AIK in the Swedish Hockey League (SHL).

Early life
Johnson was born on January 11, 1993, in Gävle. He is the oldest son of former ice hockey player Jonas Johnson. Jonathan's younger brother Andreas is also an ice hockey player, currently playing for the San Jose Sharks organization in the National Hockey League.

Playing career
Johnson started playing ice hockey with Gävle GIK at a young age, in 1998 when his father started playing for Frölunda HC Johnson joined HK Kings from Kungsbacka. During the 2007–08 season Johnson played one game for Kings' senior team in Division 3—Sweden's fifth highest league. In 2008 Johnson represented Halland in TV-pucken, collecting two assists in five games, the same year he also joined Frölunda's junior organisation for the 2008–09 season. During the 2009–10 season Johnson was the top scored in the J18 Elit South division, with 17 goals and 13 assists for a total of 30 points in 19 games, in the continuation series J18 Allsvenskan he scored nine goals and 18 points in 20 games. In the Swedish U18 Championship playoffs Johnson production dropped, scoring one goal and three points in eight games as Frölunda won a bronze medal. In 2009–10 Johnson also made his debut with the under 20 team in the J20 SuperElit. The following season he was a regular with the under 20 team, winning the 2010 European Trophy Junior tournament with Frölunda during the pre-season, and scoring six goals and 16 points in 33 games in the J20 SuperElit, while also playing sporadically with the under 18 team. In the playoffs Johnson continued suiting up for both the under 18 and under 20 team, scoring two goals and four points in four games with the under 18 team, and two goals, three points, in six games with the under 20 team, winning the Swedish Championship with both teams.

During the 2011–12 season Johnson first saw action with Frölunda's senior team, making his debut in an exhibition game against the New York Rangers, where he scored a goal on his first shot against former Frölunda keeper Henrik Lundqvist. He made his Elitserien debut on November 1 at Hovet, in a game against Djurgårdens IF. In December Johnson was loaned to Örebro HK in HockeyAllsvenskan.

Career statistics

References

External links

1993 births
Living people
Frölunda HC players
Karlskrona HK players
IK Oskarshamn players
Modo Hockey players
People from Gävle
Skellefteå AIK players
Swedish ice hockey centres
Tingsryds AIF players
IF Troja/Ljungby players
Sportspeople from Gävleborg County